Penthides rufoflavus is a species of beetle in the family Cerambycidae. It was described by Hayashi in 1957, originally under the genus Hirakura. It is known from Japan.

References

Desmiphorini
Beetles described in 1957